Seyqal Boneh (also Romanized as Şeyqal Boneh; also known as Eslām Deh and Sakhl-e Baneh Bārgū Sarā) is a village in Shirju Posht Rural District, Rudboneh District, Lahijan County, Gilan Province, Iran. At the 2006 census, its population was 201, in 57 families.

References 

Populated places in Lahijan County